Phytoecia beuni is a species of beetle in the family Cerambycidae. It was described by Stephan von Breuning in 1976. It is known from the Democratic Republic of the Congo.

References

Phytoecia
Beetles described in 1976
Endemic fauna of the Democratic Republic of the Congo